The Afghanistan Football Federation ( AFF) is the governing body of football in Afghanistan, controlling the men's and women's national teams. It was founded in 1922 and has been a member of FIFA since 1948 and the Asian Football Confederation since 1954.

The Afghanistan national football team won the 2013 South Asian Football Federation Championship, which was their first ever international football trophy. In early 2014, at the FIFA Ballon d'Or ceremony, the Afghanistan Football Federation was awarded the FIFA Fair Play Award for 2013.

Board members

Asian Football Federation Executive Member (AFG)

Membership

Presidents

References

External links
 Official website  
 Official website  
 Afghanistan at FIFA website
 Afghanistan at AFC website
 Afghanistan Football Federation President
 Afghanistan Football Federation General-Secretary

Football in Afghanistan
1922 establishments in Afghanistan
Afghanistan
Sports organizations established in 1922
Football